Tang Ab or Tangab may refer to:
 Tang Ab, Larestan, Fars Province
 Tangab, Gilan
 Tang Ab, Khuzestan
 Tangab-e Sardar, Kohgiluyeh and Boyer-Ahmad Province
 Tangab-e Shur, Kohgiluyeh and Boyer-Ahmad Province
 Tangab-e Shush, Kohgiluyeh and Boyer-Ahmad Province